Sabine Bay is an Arctic waterway in Qikiqtaaluk Region, Nunavut, Canada. Located off northern Melville Island's Sabine Peninsula, the bay is an arm of Hecla and Griper Bay. Eldridge Bay is to the north.

References

Bays of Qikiqtaaluk Region